Concrescence is a condition of teeth where the cementum overlying the roots of at least two teeth join together. It usually involves only two teeth. The most commonly involved teeth are upper second and third molars. The prevalence rate is 0.04%.

Signs and symptoms 
 Occlusion problems causing cheek biting and traumatic ulcers.
 Involved teeth may have difficulty erupting or may not erupt completely.
 May possibly cause localized periodontal destruction due to aetiological factors.
 May cause fracture of the tuberosity or floor of the maxillary sinus.

Cause 
This condition arises as the result of traumatic injury or overcrowding of teeth. True concrescence occurs during root formation phase, whereas acquired concrescence occurs after the radicular phase of development is complete.

Diagnosis 
It is difficult to diagnose clinically. Radiographs taken at different angles can aid detection of concrescence. Histological examination for extracted teeth could confirm diagnosis.

Treatment 
If the condition is not affecting the patient, no treatment is needed. Concrescence teeth could be reshaped and replaced with full crowns. However, if the teeth are having recurrent problems, non-restorable or pain, extraction should be considered.

References

External links 

Developmental tooth pathology